Genidens genidens, the Guri sea catfish or marine catfish, is a species of catfish in the family Ariidae. It was described by Georges Cuvier in 1829, originally under the genus Pimelodus. It is known from southern South American rivers connected to the Atlantic Ocean. It has been recorded spawning between Autumn and Spring. Its diet includes polychaete worms, plants, finfish, mollusks, and benthic crustaceans.

The Guri sea catfish is rated as Least Concern by the IUCN redlist.

References

Ariidae
Fish described in 1829
Taxa named by Georges Cuvier